Sundatyphlops polygrammicus, also known as the Lesser Sunda blind snake or north-eastern blind snake is a species of snake in the Typhlopidae family.

References

Typhlopidae
Reptiles described in 1839
Fauna of the Lesser Sunda Islands
Taxa named by Hermann Schlegel